Tomasso is a given name and a surname. Notable people with the name include:

Given name:
Tomasso Amici, Italian sculptor active in Cremona in the late 15th century
Tomasso Gagliano (1884–1951), American mobster and boss of the Lucchese crime family, New York City
Tomasso Petto (1879–1905), New York mobster and leading hitman in the Morello crime family during the early 1900s
Tomasso I of Saluzzo (1239–1296), the fourth Marquess of Saluzzo from 1244 to his death

Surname:
Angelo Tomasso Jr. (1925–2015), American construction and concrete executive
Daniel Di Tomasso, Canadian model and actor
George A. Tomasso (1927–2010), American construction magnate
Lisa Tomasso (born 1970), American politician and member of the Rhode Island House of Representatives
T. J. Tomasso (born 1983), American soccer player who was a goalkeeper
Tiger Joe Tomasso (1922–1988), Canadian professional wrestler
William A. Tomasso, American construction executive and white collar criminal

See also
Tomasso Group
Thomasson (surname)
Tomas (disambiguation)
Tommaso (disambiguation)